Michael Chandler (born April 24, 1986) is an American professional mixed martial artist. He currently competes in the Lightweight division in the Ultimate Fighting Championship (UFC). A professional competitor since 2009, Chandler first gained notoriety when he began competing for Bellator MMA, an organization he fought for from 2010 through 2020. There, Chandler became a three-time Bellator Lightweight Champion and was the winner of the Bellator Season Four Lightweight Tournament. As of November 2, 2021, he is #5 in the UFC lightweight rankings.

Background
Chandler was born and raised in High Ridge, Missouri, the second of four children to Michael Sr. and Betty Chandler. He is of German and Irish heritage. Chandler was on the honor roll every term in high school, received three letters in football, and finished as the runner–up at the MSHSAA State Championships as a senior in wrestling. He was voted the Most Valuable Wrestler during his senior season and was selected to the All-St. Louis Team.

Upon graduating from Northwest High School in 2004, Chandler enrolled at the University of Missouri without an athletic scholarship, walking onto the school's wrestling squad. While at Missouri, Chandler was a four-time NCAA Division I qualifier, collected 100 career wins, as well as earning fifth place at NCAA's as a senior, earning DI All-American honors. Chandler earned runner–up honors in the 2008 and 2009 Big 12 Championships and was awarded automatic bids to three of the four NCAA Championships he competed in. Chandler compiled a 31–15 record against Big 12 opponents and a 100–40 overall record in his four years as a starter. He majored in personal finance management services with a minor in real estate. He also built a close relationship with two–time Dan Hodge Trophy winner and eventual Bellator MMA World Champion Ben Askren and two–time All–American and eventual UFC Welterweight Champion Tyron Woodley.

Mixed martial arts career
Immediately after his wrestling career was over, Chandler began training mixed martial arts at Xtreme Couture. He opted out of competing as an amateur and in August 2009, Chandler made his professional MMA debut with a first-round TKO victory over Kyle Swadley.

Strikeforce
Chandler made his Strikeforce debut on November 20, 2009 at Strikeforce Challengers: Woodley vs. Bears where he fought Richard Bouphanouvong, He won the bout via technical knockout in the second round.

His next fight in the promotion took place on May 15, 2010 at Strikeforce: Heavy Artillery where he fought Sal Wood. He won the bout via submission in under a minute.

Bellator MMA
Chandler made his Bellator debut on September 30, 2010, at Bellator 31, where he defeated Scott Stapp via technical knockout in the first round. The match was contested at a catchweight for Chandler to test himself for the lightweight division, all his previous bouts being in the welterweight division.

In his next Bellator appearance, Chandler competed on the Bellator 32 card on October 14, 2010, against Chris Page in a welterweight contest. He won the bout via submission in the first round.

Bellator Season 4 Lightweight Tournament
In February 2011, it was announced that Chandler would be a part of the Bellator Season Four Lightweight Tournament. In the opening round of the tournament, Chandler faced Marcin Held, at Bellator 36 on March 12, 2011. He won the contest via technical submission after choking Held unconscious with an arm-triangle choke. The win moved Chandler into the semi-finals.

Chandler then faced Lloyd Woodard at Bellator 40 and won via unanimous decision to move onto the finals of the tournament.

The tournament final took place at Bellator 44 where Chandler faced Patricky Pitbull. He utilized his wrestling skills, repeatedly taking down Freire and controlling the fight. He defeated Freire via unanimous decision to win $100,000 and a shot at the Bellator Lightweight World Championship.

Lightweight Championship
Chandler was expected to compete against Eddie Alvarez for the Bellator Lightweight World Championship at Bellator 54 on October 15, 2011. However, Alvarez suffered an undisclosed injury forcing the bout to be postponed. The bout was then rescheduled to take place on November 19, 2011 at Bellator 58. Chandler defeated Eddie Alvarez via submission in the fourth round in an instant classic.

In his first fight after winning the title, Chandler faced Akihiro Gono in a non-title superfight at Bellator 67 on May 4, 2012.  He won the match via technical knockout at just 56 seconds into the first round.

Chandler made the first defense of his title against Bellator Season Six Lightweight Tournament Winner Rick Hawn, on January 17, 2013 at Bellator 85. He won the bout via submission in the second round.

Chandler was set to make his second defense against Bellator Season Seven Lightweight Tournament Winner Dave Jansen June 19, 2013 at Bellator 96. However, on June 2, it was announced that Jansen had pulled out of the bout due to an injury and faced David Rickels at Bellator 97 instead. He won the bout via knockout in the first round.

Title loss and return
A rematch with Eddie Alvarez took place on November 2, 2013 in the main event of Bellator 106. He lost the match by split decision in another classic.

A third fight with Alvarez was set up for the main event of Bellator 120 on May 17, 2014. However, a week before the bout, it was announced that Alvarez had suffered a concussion and was forced to pull out of the fight. Chandler instead faced Will Brooks for the interim lightweight title. He lost the back-and-forth bout by split decision.

With Bellator Lightweight Champion Eddie Alvarez leaving the promotion, Chandler faced Will Brooks in a rematch on November 15, 2014 at Bellator 131 for the vacant lightweight title. He lost the bout via technical knockout in the fourth round.

Chandler faced Derek Campos on June 19, 2015 at Bellator 138. After a dominant start on the feet, including a knockdown, he won the match via submission in the first round.

Chandler rematched David Rickels on November 6, 2015 at Bellator 145. He won the bout via technical knockout in the second round.

Second title reign
In May 2016, Bellator MMA president Scott Coker announced that Chandler would rematch Patricky Pitbull on June 17, 2016, at Bellator 157, now for the vacant Bellator Lightweight Championship. He regained the title after knocking Pitbull out in the first round.

In his first title defense, Chandler faced former UFC Lightweight Champion Benson Henderson on November 19, 2016 in the main event of Bellator 165. He won the back-and-forth bout via split decision.

In his second title defense, Chandler faced Brent Primus on June 24, 2017 at Bellator NYC. In the first round, the bout was temporarily halted by the referee to check on Chandler, whose left ankle was visibly injured. The bout was stopped in favor of Primus via technical knockout, earning him the Bellator Lightweight Championship.

Post-title reign
Following the loss to Primus, Chandler remained out of action for the remainder of 2017. He made his return at Bellator 192 on January 20, 2018, against Goiti Yamauchi. He won the fight by unanimous decision.

In a rematch, Chandler was expected to challenge Brent Primus for the Bellator Lightweight Championship on April 13, 2018 at Bellator 197. After Primus pulled out of the fight due to injury, Chandler faced Brandon Girtz on the same card. He won the fight via technical submission in the first round.

In late June 2018, reports surfaced that Chandler's contract with Bellator would expire imminently, making him a free agent. On August 22, 2018, it was announced that Chandler had re-signed a new, exclusive multi-fight contract with Bellator MMA.

Third title reign
Chandler's anticipated rematch with Brent Primus took place on December 14, 2018, at Bellator 212. Chandler dominated the majority of the fight by out-wrestling Primus, ultimately defeating him by unanimous decision and regaining the Bellator Lightweight World title in the process.

In the first defense of his new title, Chandler faced Patrício Pitbull on May 11, 2019 in the main event of Bellator 221. He lost the fight via technical knockout in the first round.

On October 25, 2019, it was announced that Chandler would return to cage to rematch Benson Henderson at Bellator & Rizin: Japan on December 29, 2019. However, Henderson was forced to withdraw from the bout citing an injury and was replaced by Sidney Outlaw in an 160 pounds catchweight bout. He defeated Outlaw via knockout in the first round.

A rematch with Benson Henderson was rescheduled to take place at Bellator 244 on June 6, 2020. However, the event was postponed due to the COVID-19 pandemic and eventually took place on August 7, 2020 at Bellator 243. He won the fight via knockout in the first round.

In August 2020 it was reported that Chandler was a free agent following his victory at Bellator 243.

Ultimate Fighting Championship 
On September 17, 2020, it was announced that Chandler had signed a contract with the UFC and served as a backup for a title bout between Khabib Nurmagomedov and Justin Gaethje at UFC 254.

Chandler made his promotional debut against Dan Hooker at UFC 257 on January 24, 2021. He won the fight via technical knockout in the first round. This win earned him the Performance of the Night  award.

Chandler faced long–time veteran Charles Oliveira for the vacant UFC Lightweight Championship, following former champion Khabib Nurmagomedov's retirement, while headlining UFC 262 on May 15, 2021. Despite nearly finishing Oliveira in round one, Chandler lost the fight via technical knockout early in the second round.

Chandler faced former UFC Interim Lightweight Champion Justin Gaethje at UFC 268 on November 6, 2021. After a back-and-forth fight, Chandler lost the bout via unanimous decision. This bout earned the Fight of the Night award. The bout was also regarded as the Fight of the Year by the UFC and various mixed martial arts media outlets.

Chandler faced former UFC Interim Lightweight Champion  Tony Ferguson on on May 7, 2022 at UFC 274. He won the fight in the second round after knocking out Ferguson with a front kick. The win earned Chandler his second Performance of the Night bonus award. It also earned him the second place Crypto.com "Fan Bonus of the Night" award.

Chandler faced Dustin Poirier on November 12, 2022, at UFC 281. He lost the fight via a rear-naked choke submission in the third round. This fight earned him the Fight of the Night award.

In early February 2023, it was announced that Chandler would be coaching The Ultimate Fighter 31 against Conor McGregor. They will face each other after the season, at an event yet to be determined.

Personal life
Chandler started dating Brie Willett in 2013 after emailing for almost two years. Subsequently, they got married in 2014. The couple grew their family through adoption in 2017, welcoming their son Hap. In April 2022, their second adoptive son Ace was born.

Chandler owns Training Camp, a fitness and MMA gym in Nashville.

Championships and awards

Mixed martial arts
Ultimate Fighting Championship
Performance of the Night (Two times)  vs. Dan Hooker and Tony Ferguson
Fight of the Night (Two times) vs. Justin Gaethje and Dustin Poirier
2021 Fight of the Year vs. Justin Gaethje
Crypto.com 
Fan Bonus of the Night 
Bellator Fighting Championships
Bellator Lightweight World Championship (Three times)
Two successful title defenses (first reign)
One successful title defense (second reign)
Three successful title defenses (overall)
Bellator Season 4 Lightweight Tournament Championship
Most submission victories in Bellator Lightweight division (6)
Tied (with David Rickels) for second most fights in Bellator history (23)
Tied (with Patrício Freire) for most stoppage wins in Bellator MMA history (13)
Most stoppage wins in Bellator Lightweight division (10)
Second most title bouts in Bellator MMA history (11)
Most wins in Bellator Lightweight division history (15)
Second most wins in Bellator MMA history (18)
Tied (with Ilima-Lei Macfarlane and Neiman Gracie) for second most submission wins in Bellator MMA history (6)
MMAJunkie
2016 June Knockout of the Month vs. Patricky Freire on June 24
2021 May Fight of the Month 
2021 November Fight of the Month vs. Justin Gaethje
2021 Fight of the Year vs. Justin Gaethje
2022 May Knockout of the Month vs. Tony Ferguson
MMAFighting.com
 2021 Fight of the Year vs. Justin Gaethje
Sherdog
2011 Breakthrough Fighter of the Year
 2021 Fight of the Year vs. Justin Gaethje
 2021 Round of the Year vs. Justin Gaethje
 2022 Knockout of the year 
Yahoo! Sports
2011 Fight of the Year vs. Eddie Alvarez on November 19
 2021 Fight of the Year vs. Justin Gaethje
 Cageside Press
 2021 Fight of the Year vs. Justin Gaethje
2022 Knockout of the Year 
Lowkick MMA
2021 Fight of the Year vs. Justin Gaethje
Bleacher Report
2021 Fight of the Year vs. Justin Gaethje
 CBS Sports
2021 Fight of the Year vs. Justin Gaethje
Daily Mirror
2021 Fight of the Year vs. Justin Gaethje
Combat Press
2021 Fight of the Year vs. Justin Gaethje
Wrestling Observer Newsletter
2021 MMA Match of the Year 
World MMA Awards
2022 Knockout of the Year vs. Tony Ferguson at UFC 274

Amateur wrestling
National Collegiate Athletic Association
NCAA Division I All-American (2009)
Big 12 Conference Championship Runner-up (2008, 2009)
University of Missouri Wrestling Team Captain (2007–2009)
Ed Lampitt Coaches Award (2009)
Hap Whitney Coaches Award (2006)
Hap Whitney Most Improved Wrestler (2006)
Missouri State High School Activities Association
MSHSAA High School State Championship Runner-up (2004)
All-St. Louis Team (2004)

Mixed martial arts record

|-
|Loss
|align=center|23–8
|Dustin Poirier
|Submission (rear-naked choke)
|UFC 281
| 
|align=center|3
|align=center|2:00
|New York City, New York, United States
|
|-
|Win
|align=center|23–7
|Tony Ferguson
|KO (front kick)
|UFC 274
|
|align=center|2
|align=center|0:17
|Phoenix, Arizona, United States
| 
|-
|Loss
|align=center|22–7
|Justin Gaethje
|Decision (unanimous)
|UFC 268
|
|align=center|3
|align=center|5:00
|New York City, New York, United States
|
|-
|Loss
|align=center|22–6
|Charles Oliveira
|TKO (punches)
|UFC 262
|
|align=center|2
|align=center|0:19
|Houston, Texas, United States
|
|-
|Win
|align=center|22–5
|Dan Hooker
|TKO (punches)
|UFC 257
|
|align=center|1
|align=center|2:30
|Abu Dhabi, United Arab Emirates
|
|-
|Win
|align=center|21–5
|Benson Henderson
|KO (punches)
|Bellator 243
|
|align=center|1
|align=center|2:09
|Uncasville, Connecticut, United States
|
|-
|Win
|align=center|20–5
|Sidney Outlaw
|KO (punches)
|Bellator 237
|
|align=center|1
|align=center|2:59
|Saitama, Japan
|
|-
|Loss
|align=center|19–5
|Patrício Pitbull
|TKO (punches)
|Bellator 221
|
|align=center|1
|align=center|1:01
|Rosemont, Illinois, United States
|
|-
|Win
|align=center|19–4
|Brent Primus
|Decision (unanimous)
|Bellator 212
|
|align=center|5
|align=center|5:00
|Honolulu, Hawaii, United States
|
|-
|Win
|align=center|18–4
|Brandon Girtz
|Technical Submission (arm-triangle choke)
|Bellator 197
|
|align=center|1
|align=center|4:00
|St. Charles, Missouri, United States
|
|-
|Win
|align=center|17–4
|Goiti Yamauchi
|Decision (unanimous)
|Bellator 192
|
|align=center|3
|align=center|5:00
|Inglewood, California, United States
|
|-
|Loss
|align=center|16–4
|Brent Primus
|TKO (doctor stoppage)
|Bellator NYC
|
|align=center|1
|align=center|2:22
|New York City, New York, United States
|
|-
|Win
|align=center|16–3
|Benson Henderson
|Decision (split)
|Bellator 165
|
|align=center|5
|align=center|5:00
|San Jose, California, United States
|
|-
| Win
| align=center|15–3
| Patricky Pitbull
| KO (punch)
| Bellator 157: Dynamite 2
| 
| align=center| 1
| align=center| 2:14
| St. Louis, Missouri, United States
|
|-
| Win
| align=center|14–3
| David Rickels
| TKO (punches)
| Bellator 145
| 
| align=center| 2
| align=center| 3:05
| St. Louis, Missouri, United States
| 
|-
| Win
| align=center|13–3
| Derek Campos
| Submission (rear-naked choke)
| Bellator 138
| 
| align=center| 1
| align=center| 2:17
| St. Louis, Missouri, United States
| 
|-
| Loss
| align=center|12–3
| Will Brooks
| TKO (punches)
| Bellator 131
| 
| align=center| 4
| align=center| 3:48
| San Diego, California, United States
| 
|-
| Loss
| align=center|12–2
| Will Brooks
| Decision (split)
| Bellator 120
| 
| align=center| 5
| align=center| 5:00
| Southaven, Mississippi, United States
| 
|-
| Loss
| align=center|12–1
| Eddie Alvarez
| Decision (split)
| Bellator 106
| 
| align=center| 5
| align=center| 5:00
| Long Beach, California, United States
| 
|-
| Win
| align=center| 12–0
| David Rickels
| KO (punches)
| Bellator 97
| 
| align=center| 1
| align=center| 0:44
| Rio Rancho, New Mexico, United States
| 
|-
| Win
| align=center| 11–0
| Rick Hawn
| Submission (rear-naked choke)
| Bellator 85
| 
| align=center| 2
| align=center| 3:07
| Irvine, California, United States
| 
|-
| Win
| align=center| 10–0
| Akihiro Gono
| TKO (punches)
| Bellator 67
| 
| align=center| 1
| align=center| 0:56
| Rama, Ontario, Canada
| 
|-
| Win
| align=center| 9–0
| Eddie Alvarez
| Submission (rear-naked choke)
| Bellator 58
| 
| align=center| 4
| align=center| 3:06
| Hollywood, Florida, United States
| 
|-
| Win
| align=center| 8–0
| Patricky Pitbull
| Decision (unanimous)
| Bellator 44
| 
| align=center| 3
| align=center| 5:00
| Atlantic City, New Jersey, United States
| 
|-
| Win
| align=center| 7–0
| Lloyd Woodard
| Decision (unanimous)
| Bellator 40
| 
| align=center| 3
| align=center| 5:00
| Newkirk, Oklahoma, United States
| 
|-
| Win
| align=center| 6–0
| Marcin Held
| Technical Submission (arm-triangle choke)
| Bellator 36
| 
| align=center| 1
| align=center| 3:56
| Shreveport, Louisiana, United States
| 
|-
| Win
| align=center| 5–0
| Chris Page
| Submission (standing guillotine choke)
| Bellator 32
| 
| align=center| 1
| align=center| 0:57
| Kansas City, Missouri, United States
| 
|-
| Win
| align=center| 4–0
| Scott Stapp
| TKO (punches)
| Bellator 31
| 
| align=center| 1
| align=center| 1:57
| Lake Charles, Louisiana, United States
| 
|-
| Win
| align=center| 3–0
| Sal Woods
| Submission (rear-naked choke)
| Strikeforce: Heavy Artillery
| 
| align=center| 1
| align=center| 0:59
| St. Louis, Missouri, United States
| 
|-
| Win
| align=center| 2–0
| Richard Bouphanouvong
| TKO (punches)
| Strikeforce Challengers: Woodley vs. Bears
| 
| align=center| 2
| align=center| 2:07
| Kansas City, Kansas, United States
| 
|-
| Win
| align=center| 1–0
| Kyle Swadley
| TKO (punches)
| First Blood OFC
| 
| align=center| 1
| align=center| 3:30
| Lake Ozark, Missouri, United States
|

Pay-per-view bouts

NCAA record

! colspan="8"| NCAA Championships Matches
|-
!  Res.
!  Record
!  Opponent
!  Score
!  Date
!  Event
|-
! style=background:white colspan=6 |2009 NCAA Championships 5th at 157 lbs
|-
|Win
|10–8
|align=left|Matt Moley
|style="font-size:88%"|2–1
|style="font-size:88%" rowspan=7|March 19–21, 2009
|style="font-size:88%" rowspan=7|2009 NCAA Division I Wrestling Championships
|-
|Loss
|9–8
|align=left|Gregor Gillespie
|style="font-size:88%"|MD 2–10
|-
|Win
|9–7
|align=left|Tyler Safratowich
|style="font-size:88%"|MD 13–5
|-
|Win
|8–7
|align=left|Jonny Bonilla-Bowman
|style="font-size:88%"|6–5
|-
|Loss
|7–7
|align=left|Jordan Leen
|style="font-size:88%"|2–4
|-
|Win
|7–6
|align=left|Chase Pami
|style="font-size:88%"|6–0
|-
|Win
|6–6
|align=left|Kurt Kinser
|style="font-size:88%"|4–3
|-
! style=background:white colspan=6 |2008 NCAA Championships at 157 lbs
|-
|Loss
|5–6
|align=left|Brandon Becker
|style="font-size:88%"|2–8
|style="font-size:88%" rowspan=4|March 20–22, 2008
|style="font-size:88%" rowspan=4|2008 NCAA Division I Wrestling Championships
|-
|Loss
|5–5
|align=left|Michael Poeta
|style="font-size:88%"|3–7
|-
|Win
|5–4
|align=left|Cyler Sanderson
|style="font-size:88%"|5–3
|-
|Win
|4–4
|align=left|Dave Nakasone
|style="font-size:88%"|5–3
|-
! style=background:white colspan=6 |2007 NCAA Championships at 157 lbs
|-
|Loss
|3–4
|align=left|Ryan Hluschak
|style="font-size:88%"|5–10
|style="font-size:88%" rowspan=4|March 15–17, 2007
|style="font-size:88%" rowspan=4|2007 NCAA Division I Wrestling Championships
|-
|Win
|3–3
|align=left|Chris Oliver
|style="font-size:88%"|MD 11–2
|-
|Win
|2–3
|align=left|Tyler Shirley
|style="font-size:88%"|Fall
|-
|Loss
|1–3
|align=left|Bubba Jenkins
|style="font-size:88%"|MD 3–15
|-
! style=background:white colspan=6 |2006 NCAA Championships at 157 lbs
|-
|Loss
|1–2
|align=left|Brandon Becker
|style="font-size:88%"|4–10
|style="font-size:88%" rowspan=3|March 16–18, 2006
|style="font-size:88%" rowspan=3|2006 NCAA Division I Wrestling Championships
|-
|Loss
|1–1
|align=left|Ben Cherrington
|style="font-size:88%"|1–8
|-
|Win
|1–0
|align=left|Matt Lebe
|style="font-size:88%"|3–2
|-

See also
 List of current UFC fighters
 List of Strikeforce alumni

References

External links
 
 

1986 births
American male mixed martial artists
Lightweight mixed martial artists
Mixed martial artists utilizing collegiate wrestling
Living people
Mixed martial artists from Missouri
People from High Ridge, Missouri
People from Boca Raton, Florida
Ultimate Fighting Championship male fighters
Bellator MMA champions
American male sport wrestlers
Missouri Tigers wrestlers
University of Missouri alumni